"I Know I'm Not Wrong" is a song by Fleetwood Mac from the 1979 double LP Tusk. It was recorded as the final song of side three of the LP on 19 September 1979, written by Lindsey Buckingham, whose sparser songwriting arrangements and the influence of punk rock and new wave were the leading creative force on it and other Tusk tracks. This was both the first and last song worked on for the Tusk album, and took almost a year to complete.

Background
While drummer Mick Fleetwood played drums on the track, Buckingham recorded another drum part on Kleenex boxes. In the 1970s, conventional drums were often in the forefront of the mix, which was something that Buckingham wanted to move away from when recording Tusk. Instead, Buckingham wanted to emulate what he heard on early rock and roll records, where the drums were more elusive.

Cath Carroll, Fleetwood Mac biographer and author of a book on the creation of Rumours, likened the rhythm of "I Know I'm Not Wrong" to that of "The Ledge", another track from the Tusk album. "A silly little synth riff toward the end puts an odd-sounding date stamp on the piece and is, in its perky way, the most jarring element on the album. This song is another piece of brilliant concision, with a half-stated simple three-note chorus." She noted the track's "not-quite-there quality that Buckingham manages to coax out of his higher vocal register" which is common to several Tusk songs.

The track "To Wild Homes" on The New Pornographers's record Mass Romantic features the melody of "I Know I'm Not Wrong" where A.C. Newman plays the song's melody over the fading chorus at the end of the track. Newman referred to it as "living proof that Tusk has haunted our music."

Other appearances
A different mix of "I Know I'm Not Wrong" was included on the 2004 reissue of Tusk. This version features louder percussion and bass, additional guitars, and a harmonica layered over the synth solo. Along with this recording, three other early demos were included on the reissue; one was an early instrumental recorded at Buckingham's home studio, where Buckingham played all of the instruments. The two other recordings were both rough takes recorded with Fleetwood Mac. Many different outtakes of "I Know I'm Not Wrong" were also included on the 2015 reissue of Tusk, many of which had never been commercially released up to that point.

"I Know I'm Not Wrong" was one of the many Tusk tracks rehearsed for the Tusk Tour, but was ultimately cut from the setlist for unknown reasons. However, Fleetwood Mac has performed the song on many recent tours. Its first appearance was in 2003 during the Say You Will Tour, replacing another Buckingham penned song, "Eyes of the World". On this tour, Mick Fleetwood's drum tech Steve Rinkov played additional drums on both songs. "I Know I'm Not Wrong" also appeared on their Unleashed Tour in 2009, and on the North American/European leg of their 2014/2015 tour On with the Show.

Personnel
Vinyl
Mick Fleetwood – drums, percussion
John McVie – bass guitar
Lindsey Buckingham – guitars, keyboards, percussion, lead vocals and backing vocals

CD
Mick Fleetwood – drums, percussion
John McVie – bass guitar
Lindsey Buckingham – guitars, keyboards, percussion, harmonica, lead and backing vocals
Christine McVie – backing vocals
Stevie Nicks – backing vocals

References
Notes

Written sources
 
 
 

Fleetwood Mac songs
1979 songs
Songs written by Lindsey Buckingham
Song recordings produced by Ken Caillat
Song recordings produced by Richard Dashut